Archibald Mooketsa Mogwe (29 August 1921 – 25 February 2021) was a politician and diplomat in Botswana. A member of parliament from Kanye, Mogwe served as the Foreign Minister from 1974 to 1984, and as the Minister of Mineral Resources and Water Affairs from 1985 to 1994, before serving as Ambassador to the United States. He was appointed to the latter post on 13 November 1995 and presented his credentials on 6 February 1996.  Mogwe also played an important role as a facilitator in the Inter-Congolese Dialogue. Early on, he made his mark as the first Permanent Secretary to the Office of President Sir Seretse Khama.

With his first wife Lena Mosele Senakhomo (d. 1992) he had three children, daughter, Maleta Luna-Rosa Mogwe (b. 1954)(whom was married to the son of Rev. Albert Alfred Frank Lock, the second [and longest serving] Speaker of the National Assembly in Botswana and a missionary for the LMS); son, Hugh Lehlohonolo Moabi Mogwe (b. 1956 d. 2012); and daughter Alice Mogwe (b. 1961). From 1997 until her death in 2020, Mogwe was married to Botswana’s first female professor, Serara Selelo-Mogwe. Mogwe has six granddaughters, one grandson and two great-grandchildren.

He died on February 25, 2021, at the age of 99.

Honours 

 Awarded the Order of the British Empire (OBE) on the eve of Botswana's independence in 1966

References

1921 births
2021 deaths
Ambassadors of Botswana to the United States
Botswana diplomats
Foreign Ministers of Botswana
Government ministers of Botswana
Members of the National Assembly (Botswana)
People from Kanye, Botswana